The Men's touch rugby tournament at the 2003 Pacific Games was held in Suva from 7 to 10 July 2003 at the Veiuto Primary School. Fiji won the gold medal, defeating Papua New Guinea by 6–5 in the final. Samoa took the bronze medal.

Participants
Seven teams played in the tournament:

Format
The teams played a round-robin followed by play-offs for the medals.

Preliminary round

Day 1

Day 2

Day 3

Lower bracket play-offs

Seventh place knockout

Fifth play-off

Medal play-offs

Major semi-final

Elimination semi-final

Preliminary final

Final

See also
 Touch rugby at the Pacific Games

References

2003 South Pacific Games
Touch rugby at the 2003 South Pacific Games